Lee Township is one of seventeen townships in Adair County, Iowa, USA.  At the 2010 census, its population was 214.

History
Lee Township was organized in 1880.

Geography

References

External links
 US-Counties.com
 City-Data.com

Townships in Adair County, Iowa
Townships in Iowa
1880 establishments in Iowa
Populated places established in 1880